Antonio Ricciardi, better known as Antonio Ricardo (1532 – 1605/1606), was an Italian from Turin who became the first printer in South America and worked in Lima, Peru from 1584 until his death in 1605 or 1606.

Biography
Antonio Ricciardi was born in Turin in 1532. His father Sebastiano Ricciardi came from Monticello d'Alba, and his mother Gigliani Pallodi was a native of Turin. He had a brother Pietro who lived in Venice. Ricciardi worked with the printer Gerolamo Farina in Turin. Afterwards he went to Venice and Lyon, where he met Pedro Ocharte, one of the earliest printers in Mexico. Together they traveled to Valladolid and Medina del Campo, where they worked with the printers Del Canto.

Ricardo emigrated to Mexico in presumably May 1570, where he worked in the shop of Pedro Ocharte. He also married Catalina Aguda in those years. He was a printer in Mexico City from 1577 to 1579, with his office in the San Pedro y San Pablo College of the Jesuits. In those three years, he printed at least twelve works, published in ten books.

He moved to Acapulco in March 1580 and from there moved on to Callao, on the Peruvian coast, in January 1581. From there he travelled to Lima. He left his wife behind in Mexico City, presumably to deal with his creditors: one of those was Pedro Ocharte, who had supplied him with the necessary equipment to set up his own printing office. For three years, he tried to get the necessary royal approval to become a printer: finally, on 13 February 1584, the Jesuits gave him the permission to start printing texts for them, without having received the royal approval yet.

The Third Council of Lima had ordered the production of a trilingual catechism in Spanish, Quechua and Aymara. Ricardo received the order, thereby becoming the first printer in South America, and he remained the only one until his death. He was granted official permission to set up a printing press in Lima from Philip II of Spain on 7 August 1584. The first publication ever printed in South America was a four-page leaflet with information about the new Gregorian calendar of 1582, which was immediately adopted by Spain, but which hadn't yet been communicated to the colonies. Between 1584 and 1605, Ricardo would publish at least 40 works.

In 1605, Ricardo was summoned to appear before the Inquisition. The same year or the next year, he died. His office was taken over by Francisco del Canto, a son of the Del Cantos from Medina del Campo, who had worked in Ricardo's workshop previously and who would hold the monopoly on printing in Peru until 1619.

Works published

In Mexico
1577: Emblemata by Andreas Alciatus
1577: Tristes by Ovid
1577: , by Juan de Medina Plaza
1578: , by Juan de Córdova
1578: , by Alonso Lopez de Hinojoso, the first text on surgery printed in the Americas
1579: , by Manuel Álvares
1579: , by Agustin Farfan
1579: , by Pedro de Morales

In Peru
1584: , a four-page edict on the new Gregorian calendar, probably the first work printed in South America
1584: , the first book printed in South America, and the first printed book with text in Quechua and Aymara
1585: 
1585: 
1585:  by José de Acosta
1586:  (reprinted 1603, 1604 and 1614)
1586:  by Alonso de Barzana
1596:  by Pedro de Oña, first impression of the best known work of Chile's first poet
1597: , by Joan de Belveder
1598: , by Geronimo de Ore
1601: 
1602:  by Diego d'Avalos y Figueroa
1602: 
1603: , by Juan de Hevia Bolaños
1604: , by Miguel de Agia
1606:  by Jéronimo Valera

Notes

Further reading
  1904-1907.
Rodriguez-Buckingham, Antonio (1978). “Establishment, Production, and Equipment of the First Printing Press in South America.” Harvard Library Bulletin 26 (July): 342–54.

16th-century Italian businesspeople
1532 births
1605 deaths
Businesspeople from Turin
People from Lima
Italian emigrants to Peru
Italian printers
Printing by continent